Vidhivilasa is a 1962 Kannada language swashbuckler film directed by S. V. Mahesh. The film stars Rajkumar, Leelavathi and K. S. Ashwath. The film is based on the story of a King who confronts destiny (fate), which appears to him in the form of a young lady, by challenging it on how he would die. The King tries in vain all means at his disposal to prevent events that destiny foretold would happen. Finally, destiny wins, employing a twisted turn of events. The film has musical score by T. Padman. The story, screenplay, dialogues and lyrics were written by H. L. Narayana Rao who happens to be the father of actor Vishnuvardhan.

Cast
 Rajkumar as Vijaya, the son of King's commander.
 Leelavathi as Chanchala.
 K. S. Ashwath as King
 Udaykumar as another King who rescues the infant son of Malathi.
 Harini as Lakshmi
 Narasimharaju as Ranjana
 M. N. Lakshmi Devi

Soundtrack
The music was composed by T. Padman with lyrics by H. L. Narayana Rao.

References

1962 films
1960s Kannada-language films